The San Diego Reader is an alternative press newspaper in the county of San Diego. It was founded in 1972 by Jim Holman.

It is known for its literary style of journalism and coverage of the arts, specifically film and theater.

Published weekly since October 1972, the Reader is distributed free on Wednesday and Thursday via street boxes and cooperating retail outlets.

In 2023, reporter Catherine Cranston's press pass was revoked by the San Diego Police Department after she used a false name - the pseudonym Eva Knott - to fill out court documents seeking permission to record and take photographs of a criminal conspiracy case against members of Antifa who fought with Trump supporters and white supremacists at a protest in Pacific Beach in the days after the January 6th United States capitol attack for the Reader.

References

External links

The San Diego Reader website
"Overheard in San Diego" comic strip gallery
"Famous Former Neighbors" San Diego celebrities comic strip gallery
 "Obermeyer’s Cut" political comic strip gallery

Weekly newspapers published in California
Newspapers published in San Diego
Alternative weekly newspapers published in the United States
Companies based in San Diego